J. A. D. Jensen Nunataks are a nunatak group in Greenland. Administratively it falls under the Sermersooq Municipality.

This geographic feature was named after  Danish naval officer and Arctic explorer Jens Arnold Diderich Jensen.

Geography
The J. A. D. Jensen Nunataks are located in Southwest Greenland to the northeast of the Dalager Nunataks, near the western limit of the Greenland Ice Sheet and about 60 km from the coast. 

Climate
Polar climate prevails in the region. The average annual temperature in the area of the J. A. D. Jensen Nunataks is -14 °C. The warmest month is July when the average temperature reaches -4 °C and the coldest is February when the temperature sinks to -20 °C.

See also
List of nunataks of Greenland

References

Jensen